Ignacio de la Garza (born 1905, date of death unknown) was a Mexican footballer. He played in six matches for the Mexico national football team in 1923. He was also part of Mexico's squad for the football tournament at the 1928 Summer Olympics, but he did not play in any matches.

References

External links
 

1905 births
Year of death missing
Mexican footballers
Mexico international footballers
Place of birth missing
Association footballers not categorized by position
Footballers at the 1928 Summer Olympics
Olympic footballers of Mexico